Claire Louise van Kampen, Lady Rylance (born 3 November 1953) is an English director, composer and playwright. She composed the music for Mark Rylance's 1989 performance as Hamlet and shared the 2007 Sam Wanamaker Award with him. Her composing credits include music for productions of the plays Days and Nights and Boeing-Boeing.

In 2015, she was historical music advisor and arranger of Tudor music on the BBC TV series Wolf Hall.

Early life
Van Kampen was born in Marylebone, London, England. She originally trained as a pianist at the Royal College of Music for five years, becoming the recipient of a John Land scholarship. As a girl she met David Munrow, a recorder player and pioneer of the early music scene in England, and became interested in Renaissance music.

Studying music theory with Dr Ruth Gipps, she also specialised in the performance of 20th century music, premiering works by today's composers.

Career
In 1986, she joined the Royal Shakespeare Company, and the Royal National Theatre, the first female musical director with both companies. In 1990, she co-founded the theatre company Phoebus Cart with her husband Mark Rylance.

Since the opening of the Shakespeare's Globe Theatre in 1997, van Kampen has been the Director of Theatre Music, creating both period and contemporary music for 30 of the Globe's productions – including the 'jazz' Macbeth in 2001, and The Golden Ass in 2002, which contained a 30-minute opera Cupid and Psyche.

In spring 2007, she received the Vero Nihil Verius award for Distinguished Achievement in the Arts, conferred upon her by Concordia University in Oregon, United States. Together with Mark Rylance and Jenny Tiramani, she received the 2007 Sam Wanamaker Award for the founding work during the opening ten years at Shakespeare's Globe Theatre.

Farinelli and the King is van Kampen's historical play about the relationship between Farinelli, the castrato, and the Spanish King Philippe V, first performed at Sam Wanamaker Playhouse in February and March 2015, and at the Duke of York's Theatre in the West End, London from September to December 2015, with Mark Rylance as Philippe V. It received six Olivier Award nominations including Best Play. In 2016 she directed Mark Rylance in Nice Fish at the St. Ann's Warehouse, New York. The production subsequently transferred to the Harold Pinter Theatre

Personal life
Van Kampen was previously married to an architect, Chris van Kampen, with whom she had two daughters, the actress Juliet Rylance and the late filmmaker Nataasha van Kampen. She met Mark Rylance in 1987, and they married in Oxfordshire on 21 December 1989.

Her daughter Nataasha died of a suspected brain haemorrhage on a flight from New York in July 2012 at the age of 28.

Theatre (selected credits)

References

External links 
 
 Claire's Lecture in a series on The Building of the Sam Wanamaker Playhouse – Part 5: Music in the new theatre, August 2013
 Claire and Mark on A.R.T. theatre in New York
 Claire's composition for a Midsummer Night's Dream, here performed in Taiwan
 Claire's composition for the movie Days and Nights

Living people
1953 births
Women classical composers
English classical composers
Women film score composers
Musicians from London
British theatre directors
Women dramatists and playwrights
Wives of knights